There have been two baronetcies created for members of the Armytage family, one in the Baronetage of England and one in the Baronetage of Great Britain. One creation is extant as of 2008.

The Armytage Baronetcy, of Kirklees in the County of York, was created in the Baronetage of England on 15 December 1641 for Francis Armytage. He was succeeded by his eldest son, John, the second Baronet. He was sheriff of Yorkshire from 1668 to 1669. His three sons, Thomas, John and George, all succeeded in the title. However, they all died unmarried and the latter was succeeded by his first cousin, Thomas, the sixth Baronet. He was the son of Francis Armytage, younger son of the first Baronet. He was also unmarried and on his death in 1737 the baronetcy became extinct.

The Armytage Baronetcy, of Kirklees in the County of York, was created in the Baronetage of Great Britain on 4 July 1738 for Samuel Armytage, high sheriff of Yorkshire in 1739. He was the great-grandson of Edward Armytage, younger brother of John Armytage, father of the first Baronet of the 1641 creation. Armytage was succeeded by his eldest son, John, the second Baronet. He sat as Member of Parliament for York. He died unmarried at an early age and was succeeded by his younger brother, George, the third Baronet. He was also Member of Parliament for York. His son, George, the fourth Baronet, served as High Sheriff of Yorkshire from 1791 to 1792. He was succeeded by his grandson, George, the fifth Baronet. He was a deputy lieutenant of Yorkshire. On his death in 1899 the title passed to his eldest son, George, the sixth Baronet. He was Chairman of the Lancashire and Yorkshire Railway Company, a deputy lieutenant of Yorkshire and high sheriff of Yorkshire in 1907. He was succeeded by his eldest son, George, the seventh Baronet. He was a brigadier-general in the British Army and fought in the First World War. At the end of the Second War he was Military Governor of Hamburg in occupied Germany. As of 2008 the title is held by his grandson, Martin, the ninth Baronet, who succeeded his father in 1983.

Reginald William Armytage (1903–1984), younger son of the seventh Baronet, was a rear-admiral in the Royal Navy. His eldest son David George Armytage (b. 1929) is a captain in the Royal Navy.

The family seat is Kirklees Park, Brighouse, Yorkshire.

Armytage baronets, of Kirklees (1641)
Sir Francis Armytage, 1st Baronet (c. 1600–1644)
Sir John Armytage, 2nd Baronet (1629–1677)
Sir Thomas Armytage, 3rd Baronet (1652–1694)
Sir John Armytage, 4th Baronet (1653–1732)
Sir George Armytage, 5th Baronet (1660–1736)
Sir Thomas Armytage, 6th Baronet (1673–1737)

Armytage baronets, of Kirklees (1738)
Sir Samuel Armytage, 1st Baronet (1695–1747)
Sir John Armytage, 2nd Baronet (1732–1758)
Sir George Armytage, 3rd Baronet (1734–1783)
Sir George Armytage, 4th Baronet (1761–1836)
Sir George Armytage, 5th Baronet (1819–1899)
Sir George John Armytage, 6th Baronet (1842–1918)
Sir George Ayscough Armytage, 7th Baronet (1872–1953)
Sir John Lionel Armytage, 8th Baronet (1901–1983)
Sir (John) Martin Armytage, 9th Baronet (born 1933)

Notes

References
Kidd, Charles, Williamson, David (editors). Debrett's Peerage and Baronetage (1990 edition). New York: St Martin's Press, 1990, 

Armytage
1641 establishments in England
1738 establishments in Great Britain
Baronetcies in the Baronetage of Great Britain